The 1978–79 Israel State Cup (Gvia HaMedina) was the 40th season of Israel's nationwide football cup competition and the 25th after the Israeli Declaration of Independence.

The competition was won by Beitar Jerusalem who have beaten Maccabi Tel Aviv 2–1 at the final.

Results

Fifth round

Sixth Round

Seventh Round

Round of 16

Quarter-finals

Semi-finals

Final

References
100 Years of Football 1906-2006, Elisha Shohat (Israel), 2006, p. 247
Ra'anana eliminated from cup games Davar, 21.1.1979, Historical Jewish Press 
Cup (Page 17) Hadshot HaSport, 21.1.1979, archive.football.co.il 
Hapoel Ashkelon - Bat Yam 3:2 on penalties Davar, 7.2.1979, Historical Jewish Press 
Maccabi Be'er Sheva also eliminated Maccabi Herzliya Davar, 8.2.1979, Historical Jewish Press 
In a victory over "Aliyah" Ramla advanced to the next round against Jaffa Maariv, 14.2.1979, Historical Jewish Press 
Cup (Pages 2-5) Hadshot HaSport, 18.2.1979, archive.football.co.il 

Israel State Cup
State Cup
Israel State Cup seasons